The 1584 siege of Takehana was something of a follow-up to the siege of Kaganoi; the great warlord Toyotomi Hideyoshi sought to consolidate his power, particularly in the lands of his late lord Oda Nobunaga.

History 
Hideyoshi employed the same tactics at Takehana as at Kaganoi, diverting the Kiso River with a dam and flooding the fortress.

References

Takehana
Takehana
1584 in Japan
Conflicts in 1584